Santa María is a municipality in the Usulután department of El Salvador.

Nearby Cities and Towns 
West:
 Usulután (1.0 nm)
North:
 Cerro El Nanzal (2.2 nm)
 El Cerrito (2.2 nm)
 San Francisco (1.4 nm)
East:
 La Constancia (1.0 nm)
South:
 El Trillo (2.2 nm)
 Santa Barbara (2.2 nm)
 La Laguna (1.4 nm)
 Palo Galan (1.4 nm)
 Mejicapa (1.4 nm)

Sports
The local football club is named Municipal Santa María and it currently plays in the Salvadoran Second Division.

Municipalities of the Usulután Department